Herman O. Thomson (born 6 April 1929) is a retired lieutenant general in the United States Air Force who served as director for plans and policy for the Joint Staff from 1983 to 1985. He was commissioned through ROTC at Texas A&M University in 1951.

References

1929 births
Living people
United States Air Force generals